The Ebony Shoe award (Dutch: Ebbenhouten schoen, French:  Soulier d'ébène) is a football award in Belgium given annually to the best African or African origin player in the Belgian Pro League. The jury is composed of the coaches of league clubs, the Belgium national team manager, sport journalists, and one or more honorary jurors.

As of 2020, Mbark Boussoufa (3 wins), Daniel Amokachi (2 wins), Vincent Kompany (2 wins) and Dieumerci Mbokani (2) are the only players to have won the trophy more than once.

Winners

Breakdown of winners

By country of origin

By club

References

Belgian football trophies and awards
Annual events in Belgium